The 2002 Kawasaki Frontale season. Kawasaki Frontale is a Japanese professional football club based in Kawasaki, Kanagawa Prefecture, south of Tokyo. This article summarizes the competition and results of the season.

Competitions

Domestic results

J. League 2

Emperor's Cup

Player statistics

Other pages
 J. League official site

Kawasaki Frontale
Kawasaki Frontale seasons